Seyyedabad (also Romanized as Seyyedābād) is a village in Angut-e Sharqi Rural District, Anguti District, Germi County, Ardabil Province, Iran. At the 2006 census, its population was 211, in 37 families.

References 

Tageo

Towns and villages in Germi County